Sainthill, or St. Hill (anciently spelt 'de Sweynthill') is an English surname of Norman origin.

Notable people with this surname include:

 Peter Sainthill (MP for Tiverton) (1593-1648), English politician known for his role in the English Civil War
Sir Walter de Sweynthill (died circa 1340), English Knight who represented Devon in the Parliaments of Edward II and Edward III
Peter Sainthill (died 1571), English politician
Sir Peter Sainthill F.R.S. (1698- 1775), preeminent 18th century surgeon, who served as Master of the Company of Surgeons (1749-1750)
Lieutenant-Colonel Windle St. Hill (1839-1918)
Loudon Sainthill (1918-1969), Australian artist

Sainthill is also a given name:

 Sir Sainthill Eardley-Wilmot K.C.I.E. (1825-1929), British Civil Servant and Conservationist who served as Inspector-General of Forests
 Sir Merlin Charles Sainthill Hanbury-Tracy, 7th Baron Sudeley (b. 1939), British Peer and Conservative Party Politician

See also 

  Bradninch Manor, the family seat of the Sainthill (also spelt St. Hill) family from 1553